The Jungle Book (1894) is a collection of stories by the English author Rudyard Kipling. Most of the characters are animals such as Shere Khan the tiger and Baloo the bear, though a principal character is the boy or "man-cub" Mowgli, who is raised in the jungle by wolves. The stories are set in a forest in India; one place mentioned repeatedly is "Seonee" (Seoni), in the central
state of Madhya Pradesh.

A major theme in the book is abandonment followed by fostering, as in the life of Mowgli, echoing Kipling's own childhood. The theme is echoed in the triumph of protagonists including Rikki-Tikki-Tavi and The White Seal over their enemies, as well as Mowgli's. Another important theme is of law and freedom; the stories are not about animal behaviour, still less about the Darwinian struggle for survival, but about human archetypes in animal form. They teach respect for authority, obedience, and knowing one's place in society with "the law of the jungle", but the stories also illustrate the freedom to move between different worlds, such as when Mowgli moves between the jungle and the village. Critics have also noted the essential wildness and lawless energies in the stories, reflecting the irresponsible side of human nature.

The Jungle Book has remained popular, partly through its many adaptations for film and other media. Critics such as Swati Singh have noted that even critics wary of Kipling for his supposed imperialism have admired the power of his storytelling. The book has been influential in the scout movement, whose founder, Robert Baden-Powell, was a friend of Kipling. Percy Grainger composed his Jungle Book Cycle around quotations from the book.

Context
The stories were first published in magazines in 1893–94. The original publications contain illustrations, some by the author's father, John Lockwood Kipling. Rudyard Kipling was born in India and spent the first six years of his childhood there. After about ten years in England, he went back to India and worked there for about six and a half years. These stories were written when Kipling lived in Naulakha, the home he built in Dummerston, Vermont, in the United States. There is evidence that Kipling wrote the collection of stories for his daughter Josephine, who died from pneumonia in 1899, aged 6; a first edition of the book with a handwritten note by the author to his young daughter was discovered at the National Trust's Wimpole Hall in Cambridgeshire, England, in 2010.

Book

Description
The tales in the book (as well as those in The Second Jungle Book, which followed in 1895 and includes eight further stories, including five about Mowgli) are fables, using animals in an anthropomorphic manner to teach moral lessons. The verses of "The Law of the Jungle", for example, lay down rules for the safety of individuals, families, and communities. Kipling put in them nearly everything he knew or "heard or dreamed about the Indian jungle". Other readers have interpreted the work as allegories of the politics and society of the time.

Origins

The stories in The Jungle Book were inspired in part by the ancient Indian fable texts such as the Panchatantra and the Jataka tales. For example, an older moral-filled mongoose and snake version of the "Rikki-Tikki-Tavi" story by Kipling is found in Book 5 of Panchatantra. In a letter to the American author Edward Everett Hale, Kipling wrote,

In a letter written and signed by Kipling in or around 1895, states Alison Flood in The Guardian, Kipling confesses to borrowing ideas and stories in the Jungle Book: "I am afraid that all that code in its outlines has been manufactured to meet 'the necessities of the case': though a little of it is bodily taken from (Southern) Esquimaux rules for the division of spoils," Kipling wrote in the letter. "In fact, it is extremely possible that I have helped myself promiscuously but at present cannot remember from whose stories I have stolen."

Setting

Kipling lived in India as a child, and most of the stories are evidently set there, though it is not entirely clear where. The Kipling Society notes that "Seonee" (Seoni, in the central Indian state of Madhya Pradesh) is mentioned several times; that the "cold lairs" must be in the jungled hills of Chittorgarh; and that the first Mowgli story, "In the Rukh", is set in a forest reserve somewhere in North India, south of Simla. "Mowgli's Brothers" was positioned in the Aravalli hills of Rajasthan (northwestern India) in an early manuscript, later changed to Seonee, and Bagheera treks from "Oodeypore" (Udaipur), a journey of reasonable length to Aravalli but a long way from Seoni. Seoni has a tropical savanna climate, with a dry and a rainy season. This is drier than a monsoon climate and does not support tropical rainforest. Forested parks and reserves that claim to be associated with the stories include Kanha Tiger Reserve, Madhya Pradesh, and Pench National Park, near Seoni. However, Kipling never visited the area.

Chapters
The book is arranged with a story in each chapter. Each story is followed by a poem that serves as an epigram.

Characters

Many of the characters (marked *) are named simply for the Hindustani names of their species: for example, Baloo is a transliteration of Hindustani भालू/بھالو Bhālū, "bear". The characters (marked ^) from "The White Seal" are transliterations from the Russian of the Pribilof Islands.

 Akela * – A wolf
 Bagheera * – A black panther
 Baloo * — A bear
 Bandar-log * – A tribe of monkeys
 Chil * – A kite, in earlier editions called Rann (रण Raṇ, "battle")
 Chuchundra * – A muskrat
 Darzee * – A tailorbird
 Father Wolf – The father wolf who raised Mowgli as his own cub
 Grey brother – One of Mother and Father Wolf's cubs
 Hathi *  – An Indian elephant
 Ikki * – A porcupine
 Kaa * – A python
 Karait * – A krait
 Kotick ^ – A white seal
 Mang * – A bat
 Mor * – An Indian peafowl
 Mowgli – Main character, the young jungle boy
 Nag * – A male cobra
 Nagaina * – A female cobra, Nag's mate
 Raksha  – The Mother wolf who raised Mowgli as her own cub
 Rikki-Tikki-Tavi – A mongoose
 Sea Catch ^ – A seal and Kotick's father
 Sea Cow – A (Steller's) sea cow
 Sea Vitch ^ – A walrus
 Shere Khan * — A tiger
 Tabaqui * – A jackal

Illustrations

The early editions were illustrated with drawings in the text by John Lockwood Kipling (Rudyard's father), and the American artists W. H. Drake and Paul Frenzeny.

Editions and translations

The book has appeared in over 500 print editions, and over 100 audiobooks. It has been translated into at least 36 languages.

Themes

Abandonment and fostering

Critics such as Harry Ricketts have observed that Kipling returns repeatedly to the theme of the abandoned and fostered child, recalling his own childhood feelings of abandonment. In his view, the enemy, Shere Khan, represents the "malevolent would-be foster-parent" who Mowgli in the end outwits and destroys, just as Kipling as a boy had to face Mrs Holloway in place of his parents. Ricketts writes that in "Mowgli's Brothers", the hero loses his human parents at the outset, and his wolf fosterers at the conclusion; and Mowgli is again rejected at the end of "Tiger! Tiger!", but each time is compensated by "a queue of would-be foster-parents" including the wolves, Baloo, Bagheera and Kaa. In Ricketts's view, the power that Mowgli has over all these characters who compete for his affection is part of the book's appeal to children. The historian of India Philip Mason similarly emphasises the Mowgli myth, where the fostered hero, "the odd man out among wolves and men alike", eventually triumphs over his enemies. Mason notes that both Rikki-Tikki-Tavi and The White Seal do much the same.

Law and freedom

The novelist Marghanita Laski argued that the purpose of the stories was not to teach about animals but to create human archetypes through the animal characters, with lessons of respect for authority. She noted that Kipling was a friend of the founder of the Scout Movement, Robert Baden-Powell, who based the junior scout "Wolf Cubs" on the stories, and that Kipling admired the movement. Ricketts wrote that Kipling was obsessed by rules, a theme running throughout the stories and named explicitly as "the law of the jungle". Part of this, Ricketts supposed, was Mrs Holloway's evangelicalism, suitably transformed. The rules required obedience and "knowing your place", but also provided social relationships and "freedom to move between different worlds". Sandra Kemp observed that the law may be highly codified, but that the energies are also lawless, embodying the part of human nature which is "floating, irresponsible and self-absorbed". There is a duality between the two worlds of the village and the jungle, but Mowgli, like Mang the bat, can travel between the two.

The novelist and critic Angus Wilson noted that Kipling's law of the jungle was "far from Darwinian", since no attacks were allowed at the water-hole, even in drought. In Wilson's view, the popularity of the Mowgli stories is thus not literary but moral: the animals can follow the law easily, but Mowgli has human joys and sorrows, and the burden of making decisions. Kipling's biographer, Charles Carrington, argued that the "fables" about Mowgli illustrate truths directly, as successful fables do, through the character of Mowgli himself; through his "kindly mentors", Bagheera and Baloo; through the repeated failure of the "bully" Shere Khan; through the endless but useless talk of the Bandar-log; and through the law, which makes the jungle "an integrated whole" while enabling Mowgli's brothers to live as the "Free People".

The academic Jan Montefiore commented on the book's balance of law and freedom that "You don't need to invoke Jacqueline Rose on the adult's dream of the child's innocence or Perry Nodelman's theory of children's literature colonising its readers' minds with a double fantasy of the child as both noble savage and embryo good citizen, to see that the Jungle Books .. give their readers a vicarious experience of adventure both as freedom and as service to a just State".

Reception
Sayan Mukherjee, writing for the Book Review Circle, calls The Jungle Book "One of the most enjoyable books of my childhood and even in adulthood, highly informative as to the outlook of the British on their 'native population'."

The academic Jopi Nyman argued in 2001 that the book formed part of the construction of "colonial English national identity" within Kipling's "imperial project". In Nyman's view, nation, race and class are mapped out in the stories, contributing to "an imagining of Englishness as a site of power and racial superiority." Nyman suggested that The Jungle Book'''s monkeys and snakes represent "colonial animals" and "racialized Others" within the Indian jungle, whereas the White Seal promotes "'truly English' identities in the nationalist allegory" of that story.

Swati Singh, in his Secret History of the Jungle Book, notes that the tone is like that of Indian folklore, fable-like, and that critics have speculated that the Kipling may have heard similar stories from his Hindu bearer and his Portuguese ayah (nanny) during his childhood in India. Singh observes, too, that Kipling wove "magic and fantasy" into the stories for his daughter Josephine, and that even critics reading Kipling for signs of imperialism could not help admiring the power of his storytelling.The Jungle Book came to be used as a motivational book by the Cub Scouts, a junior element of the Scouting movement. This use of the book's universe was approved by Kipling at the request of Robert Baden-Powell, founder of the Scouting movement, who had originally asked for the author's permission for the use of the Memory Game from Kim in his scheme to develop the morale and fitness of working-class youths in cities. Akela, the head wolf in The Jungle Book, has become a senior figure in the movement; the name is traditionally adopted by the leader of each Cub Scout pack.

AdaptationsThe Jungle Book has been adapted many times in a wide variety of media. In literature, Robert Heinlein wrote the Hugo Award-winning science fiction novel, Stranger in a Strange Land (1961), when his wife, Virginia, suggested a new version of The Jungle Book, but with a child raised by Martians instead of wolves. Neil Gaiman's The Graveyard Book (2008) is inspired by The Jungle Book. It follows a baby boy who is found and brought up by the dead in a cemetery. It has many scenes that can be traced to Kipling, but with Gaiman's dark twist.

In music, the Jungle Book cycle (1958) was written by the Australian composer Percy Grainger, an avid Kipling reader. It consists of quotations from the book, set as choral pieces and solos for soprano, tenor or baritone. The French composer Charles Koechlin wrote several symphonic works inspired by the book.  
BBC Radio broadcast an adaptation on 14 February 1994 and released it as a BBC audiobook in 2008. It was directed by Chris Wallis with Nisha K. Nayar as Mowgli, Eartha Kitt as Kaa, Freddie Jones as Baloo, and Jonathan Hyde as Bagheera. The music was by John Mayer.

The book's text has been adapted for younger readers with comic book adaptations such as DC Comics Elseworlds' story, "Superman: The Feral Man of Steel", in which an infant Superman is raised by wolves, while Bagheera, Akela, and Shere Khan make appearances. Marvel Comics published several adaptations by Mary Jo Duffy and Gil Kane in the pages of Marvel Fanfare (vol. 1). These were collected in the one-shot Marvel Illustrated: The Jungle Book (2007). Bill Willingham's comic book series, Fables, features The Jungle Books Mowgli, Bagheera, and Shere Khan.Manga Classics: The Jungle Book was published by UDON Entertainment's Manga Classics imprint in June 2017.

Many films have been based on one or another of Kipling's stories, including Elephant Boy (1937), Chuck Jones's made for-TV cartoons Rikki-Tikki-Tavi (1975), The White Seal (1975), and Mowgli's Brothers (1976).

Stuart Paterson wrote a stage adaptation in 2004, first produced by the Birmingham Old Rep in 2004 and published in 2007 by Nick Hern Books.

In 2021 BBC Radio 4 broadcast an adaptation by Ayeesha Menon which resets the story as a "gangland coming-of-age fable" in modern India.'

See also

Feral children in mythology and fiction

Notes

References

External links

 
 1910 edition at Archive.org
 
 

 
1894 short story collections
Short story collections by Rudyard Kipling
19th-century British children's literature
Macmillan Publishers books
British children's books
Children's short story collections
Novels about orphans
Novels set in India
Animal tales
Rudyard Kipling writings about India
1890s children's books